The Grumman XP-50 was a land-based development of the shipboard XF5F-1 Skyrocket fighter, entered into a United States Army Air Corps (USAAC) contest for a twin-engine heavy interceptor aircraft. The USAAC placed an order for a prototype on 25 November 1939, designating it XP-50, but it lost the competition to the Lockheed XP-49.

Design and development
First assigned Design 34, later G-41 by the builder, Grumman, the design was entered into competition alongside proposals from Bell, Brewster, Curtiss, Lockheed, and Vought. The XP-50 design was similar to that of the XF5F-1 with modifications to the fuselage nose to house the nose-wheel of the tricycle landing gear and provisions for self-sealing fuel tanks and pilot armor. The planned armament was two 20 mm (.79 in) cannon and two .50 in (12.7 mm) machine guns.

Testing
During testing, the XP-50 prototype (39-2517) was lost on 14 May 1941, falling victim to a turbo-supercharger explosion that destroyed the aircraft. The test pilot Robert Hall bailed out while the XP-50 plunged into Smithtown Bay in Long Island Sound.

Based upon experience with the XF5F-1 and the XP-50, Grumman had begun work on a more advanced fighter, designated model G-51. Thus, the USAAC decided to replace the XP-50 with the newer design and recommended procurement of two G-51s, designated XP-65, using the original XP-50 expenditure order to cover the development. Consideration was given to combining the Air Corps and Navy requirements into a common design, but the weight and performance penalties inherent in conflicting requirements were considered great enough that separate designs would be needed. Since the U.S. Navy considered Grumman one of its major production sources and that producing two different model aircraft by Grumman would impede manufacture of aircraft types the U.S. Navy needed, it was decided that development of the XF7F-1 would continue, and the XP-65 as a parallel development was abandoned.

Variants
XP-50
Version of the XF5F for the United States Army Air Corps with two 1,200 hp (895 kW) Wright R-1820-67/69 engines, one built.
XP-65
Improved version of the XP-50 with two R-2600-10 engines; none built—project only.

Specifications (XP-50, estimated)

See also

References

Notes

Bibliography

  Dorr, Robert F. and David Donald. Fighters of the United States Air Force. London: Temple, 1990. .
 Green, William. War Planes of the Second World War, Volume Four: Fighters. London: MacDonald & Co. (Publishers) Ltd., 1961 (Sixth impression 1969). .
 Lucabaugh, David and Bob Martin. Grumman XF5F-1 & XP-50 Skyrocket, Naval Fighters Number Thirty-one. Simi Valley, California: Ginter Books, 1995. .

External links

 Joseph F. Baugher – Grumman XP-50
 Grumman XP-50 Skyrocket

P-050
Grumman P-50
Low-wing aircraft
Aircraft first flown in 1941
Twin piston-engined tractor aircraft